Royal Stadium may refer to:

 Darrell K Royal–Texas Memorial Stadium, in Austin, Texas
 Royal Bafokeng Stadium, in Phokeng, South Africa
 Royal Oman Police Stadium, in Muscat, Oman

It may also be used to refer to:

 Kauffman Stadium (formerly Royals Stadium), in Kansas City, Missouri
 Park Royal Stadium, a former greyhound stadium in London
 RDS Arena (full name Royal Dublin Society Arena), in Ballsbridge, Ireland
 Royal Athletic Park, in Victoria, British Columbia